The Adams Memorial is a proposed United States presidential memorial to honor the second President John Adams; his wife and prolific writer Abigail Adams; their son, the sixth President John Quincy Adams; John Quincy Adams' wife Louisa Catherine Adams; and other members of the Adams family including John Quincy Adams' son Charles Francis Adams, Sr., a Civil War diplomat, politician, and editor; and Charles' two sons, Henry Adams, a noted historian and autobiographer, and academician Brooks Adams. As of March 2022, ten of the twelve members of the Adams Memorial Commission had yet to be appointed, with two vacancies to be filled by the U.S. president and eight by Congress.

History
The United States Congress authorized the Adams Memorial Foundation to proceed with the design and construction of a memorial on November 5, 2001. The foundation was authorized to raise private funds to construct a memorial on federal land in Washington, D.C. Once established, the memorial was then to be turned over to the federal government. On December 2, 2002, Congress amended this legislation to permit the Adams Memorial to be constructed within Area 1, the central core of the District of Columbia centered on the National Mall.

The Commemorative Works Clarification and Revision Act of 2003 (CWCRA), however, gave the Adams Memorial Foundation and other memorial efforts then under way just seven years to raise the funds and begin construction. When the memorial foundation was unable to raise the funds, Congress passed legislation on October 30, 2009, giving the Adams Memorial effort until September 30, 2010, to complete its fundraising. On December 2, 2009, Congress passed legislation applying the CWCRA to the Adams Memorial, although the clock began running with passage of the Area I authorization. Congress extended the deadline for fund-raising yet again on May 24, 2010, giving the memorial until December 2, 2013, to finish its efforts.

Authorization for the Adams Memorial expired on December 2, 2013, without a memorial having begun construction. Congress again reauthorized the memorial on July 22, 2014, extending the deadline to December 2, 2020. Following the continued failure of the foundation to select a location and raise funds, the March 2019 John D. Dingell, Jr. Conservation, Management, and Recreation Act established an Adams Memorial Commission to establish the memorial, with members appointed by Congress and the president. President Trump made two of four presidential appointments in fall 2020, Timothy Harleth and Jackie Gingrich Cushman, daughter of former U.S. House Speaker Newt Gingrich. 

As of March 2023 the Speaker of the House Kevin McCarthy and Senate President pro tempore Patty Murray have not yet made any of their eight appointments. According to Section 2406 of the 2019 authorizing statute, while the presidential appointments may be any member of the public, the congressional appointments can be only current elected members of the House and Senate.  The commission expires December 2, 2025.

See also
List of national memorials of the United States
Presidential memorials in the United States
Memorial to the 56 Signers of the Declaration of Independence

References

External links
 : Public Law 107-62, establishing the Foundation
 : Public Law 116-9, reconstituting commission with 2025 expiration date in Section 2406.

Adams political family
Proposed monuments and memorials in the United States